Alicia Beatriz Oliveira (24 November 1942 – 5 November 2014) was an Argentine jurist and politician known for her work in defense of human rights. She became friends with Father Jorge Bergoglio, later Pope Francis, who baptized her three children.

Biography
Alicia Oliveira was born in San Fernando de la Buena Vista on 24 November 1942, the youngest of three siblings from a middle-class family. She studied law at the Universidad del Salvador.

In 1973 she took office as judge of the Juvenile Correctional Court of the Federal Capital, the first woman to hold the position. While there, she established a friendship with Jesuit priest Jorge Bergoglio. She later recalled:

In 1976, Oliveira clashed with a colonel of the Federal Penitentiary Service while investigating mistreatment of political prisoners at Devoto prison. Later that year, on 24 March, she was dismissed from her position as a judge by the de facto authorities, who denounced her as, "inept, subversive, and corrupt". After this, she was protected by Beroglio from persecution by the military dictatorship. Over the next six years, she filed more habeas corpus motions than any other lawyer in Buenos Aires. Vatican ambassador Eduardo Valdés later wrote, "She always thanked Father Jorge, who in those days kept her hidden in a car to see her children, whom she loved above all things, to see them at the Colegio del Salvador."

In 1979, she accompanied Emilio F. Mignone in the creation of the Center for Legal and Social Studies. The same year, she participated in the drafting of the Justicialist Party complaint document which was signed by Deolindo Bittel and Herminio Iglesias. This was presented to the delegation of the Inter-American Commission on Human Rights during its visit to Argentina to collect complaints on the disappearances and kidnappings of political activists.

Oliveira was elected on behalf of the Front for a Country in Solidarity (FREPASO) as a conventional constituent to the 1994 amendment of the Constitution of Argentina.

From 1998 to 2003, she was Ombudsman of the City of Buenos Aires on behalf of FREPASO.

In October 1999, she participated in the management of the transfer of the remains of Father Carlos Mugica from La Recoleta to Villa 31. This was a scheme she had devised to prevent the neighborhood from being demolished to make way for a real estate development. She was aided in this by then Cardinal Jorge Bergoglio, who handled formalities with the priest's family to obtain the transfer of the body.

After the December 2001 riots, she participated in the intervention of human rights organizations for the release of the detainees in Buenos Aires.

From 2003 to 2005, Oliveira served as Secretary of Human Rights for the Ministry of Foreign Affairs.

On 19 March 2013, she was part of the presidential entourage that traveled to Vatican City to witness the inauguration of Pope Francis. When Francis faced opposition within Argentina, accusing him of having been linked with the military dictatorship, Oliveira made statements defending him in an interview with Perfil:

They did not advance beyond the primary stage.

Alicia Oliveira died at her home in Almagro on 5 November 2014, after undergoing surgery for a brain tumor. A viewing of her body was held at the Buenos Aires City Legislature.

Legacy
On 10 December 2014, President Cristina Fernández de Kirchner presented the former judge with the Azucena Villaflor Award, which was accepted by Oliveira's children. The event took place at the Casa Rosada. On 19 December, Pope Francis received her children in Vatican City, along with their spouses.

Oliveira is portrayed by Muriel Santa Ana in the Italian film Chiamatemi Francesco, which shows her friendship with Father Jorge Bergoglio.

In 2018, the Konex Foundation awarded her a posthumous Merit Diploma as one of the most important Argentine public administrators of the decade.

References

1942 births
2014 deaths
20th-century Argentine judges
Argentine human rights activists
Argentine Roman Catholics
Argentine women judges
Front for a Country in Solidarity politicians
People from San Fernando de la Buena Vista
Pope Francis
Universidad del Salvador alumni
20th-century women judges